Santa Luzia is an island of the Barlavento archipelago in Cape Verde located between São Nicolau and São Vicente, the channel of Santa Luzia separates the island of São Vicente and is 8 km wide. The area is 34.2 km². Like all Cape Verdean islands, it is of volcanic origin.  The highest point is Topona (elevation ). Santa Luzia is 12.4 km long and 5.3 km wide.

Administratively, it is not part of any municipality, but in the public domain of the state of Cape Verde. Together with the islets of Ilhéu Branco and Ilhéu Raso, Santa Luzia is on the tentative list of UNESCO's World Heritage Sites. Santa Luzia, Ilhéu Branco and Ilhéu Raso were declared a protected area as Santa Luzia Nature Reserve (Reserva Natural Integral de Santa Luzia) in 1990.

The island has never had permanent inhabitants, but it has been used for grazing animals. In the 20th century, a meteorology station was built. Today, fishermen from the nearby islands of São Vicente and Santo Antão fish in the waters around the island. Conus santaluziensis is a species of sea snails found in the waters of Santa Luzia.

References

External links

Santa Luzia at Protected Areas of Cape Verde website 

 
Uninhabited islands of Cape Verde
Former populated places in Cape Verde